Henty is a town in southwestern Victoria, Australia.

Henty is in the middle of the Henty wine region, which is also named after the early settlers.

History

The Henty and Merino area was the region of the first white settlement in what is now Victoria by the Henty brothers, starting in 1834. The indigenous custodians were the Bonedai Gundigj clan.

The railway station opened in 1884, on the Casterton railway line branch from the Portland line at Branxholme. The station closed in 1967 and the line in 1977.

Parts of the early pastoral runs were later used for soldier settlement schemes after both world wars.

Henty Post Office opened on 16 April 1885 and closed in 1977.

Traditional ownership
The formally recognised traditional owners for the area in which Henty sits are the Gunditjmara People who are represented by the Gunditj Mirring Traditional Owners Aboriginal Corporation.

References

External links

Towns in Victoria (Australia)